Horace Viner (1877 – 1935) was a Welsh professional footballer who played in the Football League for Stoke.

Career
Viner was born in Chirk and played for Birkenhead before joining Stoke in 1904. He was signed as back up to Welsh international goalkeeper Leigh Richmond Roose and Jack Benton. Viner's only appearance for Stoke game against Nottingham Forest in March 1904. On his release at the end of the season he joined Rhyl Athletic. After finishing his footballing career at Rhyl, Viner started his own caravan park.

Career statistics

References

Welsh footballers
Stoke City F.C. players
English Football League players
1877 births
1935 deaths
People from Chirk
Sportspeople from Wrexham County Borough
Association football goalkeepers
Rhyl F.C. players